Kleber Rogério do Carmo Silva (born April 14, 1981) is a former Brazilian football player.

Club statistics

References

External links

1981 births
Living people
Brazilian footballers
Brazilian expatriate footballers
J2 League players
Shonan Bellmare players
Expatriate footballers in Japan
Association football midfielders